Egyptian–Tunisian relations refers to the bilateral relationship between Egypt and Tunisia, two North African Arab countries. Historically, the two countries, which are bound by cultural and historical ties, have enjoyed a very cordial relationship.

Antiquity to medieval relations

Egypt and Tunisia were homes of two of the earliest and oldest civilizations in Africa: the Egyptian civilization and Carthaginian civilization. Trades between Carthage and Ptolemaic Kingdom were successful. Nonetheless, rivalry existed between two countries, as the Egyptians didn't trust the Carthaginians and sometimes turned against the Carthaginians, making it complicated. This complicated nature between two nations would maintain until the end of antiquity and beginning of medieval eras.

War elephants of Hannibal were thought to have traced from the Egyptians, many took parts of Hannibal's failed attempts to conquer Rome.

Both Egypt and Tunisia were together fallen to various empires later, the Roman Empire, the Arab Caliphates and the Ottoman Empire.  The most influential among all were the conquests led by Arabs in two countries in which two nations adopted the Arabic language instead of their ancient languages and the arrival of Islam. The influence of Islam and Arab also caused significant remarks with some of the oldest ongoing institutions located in two countries, notably Al-Azhar University in Egypt and Great Mosque of Kairouan in Tunisia.

With the Ottoman conquest, Egypt and Tunisia were together placed under the Turks, but Ottoman rule in two diverged by differences. Ottoman Egypt and Ottoman Tunisia both functioned as autonomous provinces of the empire but relationship were remarkedly different. The Tunisians, in majority, remained loyal to the Ottoman state and had been one of the earliest regions to support the Tanzimat, including abolishment of slavery which was one of the earliest in the world at 1846, and was even among some of the most liberal parts of the empire; but the Egyptians had a number of conflicts with the Turks, dating back to the Ottoman–Mamluk Wars, and even later Egyptian–Ottoman Wars; while at the same time, Egypt used to support the Ottomans in various Ottoman wars. This backlash of relations between Egypt to the Ottoman Empire further developed with its own different view that would eventually escalate into 20th century under Gamal Abdel Nasser. Overall, Tunisia's relations with the Ottomans were deemed as good while Egypt's relations with the Ottomans were mostly complicated.

In the late 19th century, both Egypt and Tunisia fell to the hand of European colonizers, the British Empire and France. Both were heavily modernized and effectively became some of the most liberal Arab countries, but its treatments varied. However, anti-British and anti-French activities in Egypt and Tunisia were so great that it pushed the British and French to re-decide their positions over its colonies. Both countries suffered much at the World War II, being targeted by Nazi Germany and Fascist Italy; and also the turning points of the war started in both nations, notably the North African Campaign.

Modern relations
With Tunisia became independence at 1956, Egypt and Tunisia established relations thanked for the efforts by Habib Bourguiba, who used to study in Egypt previously. Egypt and Tunisia maintained a cordial relationship, with Egypt and Tunisia were in a common front against Israel. However, after Anwar Sadat signed the Egypt–Israel peace treaty at 1973, the relationship between two soured, though not directly, as Tunisia had refrained from engaging against Israel unlike Egypt prior to Sadat. It was not until late 1980s that saw Egypt and Tunisia restored tie, but Tunisia was able to maintain low-key relations with Egypt.

In 1985, Israel launched Operation Wooden Leg, attacking Palestine Liberation Organization headquarter in Tunis, prompted angers from Tunisians. Egypt was one of these nations to condemn the attack, helped to warm relations. After the end of the Cold War, Egypt and Tunisia re-approached and became strategic partnership.

Arab Spring
The outbreak of the Arab Spring drew strong support from both Tunisians and Egyptians alike, since they were the two earliest Arab nations to be influenced by the revolution. Despite this, however, only Tunisia was more successful in transforming into democracy; Egypt, on the other hand, saw a second change of regime and even more unrest, although it was able to fully avoid civil war unlike Syria, Yemen, Iraq and Libya.

Despite the Spring, the two countries remain unsolved over its social issues. Radicalization of young people and Islamists alike, along with unstable economic conditions, have led to the two countries remaining corrupt even after the Spring.

Cooperation
In 2019, Abdel Fattah el-Sisi announced the strengthening of relations and anti-terrorism with Tunisia. Previously, two countries also signed 10 cooperation agreements in 2017. It was expected, in 2017, that the trade relationship between the two would have a boost.

There are educational exchanges between Egypt and Tunisia on many fronts.

Diplomatic missions
Egypt has an embassy in Tunis.
Tunisia has an embassy in Cairo.

References

Further reading
Egypt-Tunisia relations
A comparative historical analysis of the Ulama and the state in Egypt and Tunisia

 
Tunisia
Bilateral relations of Tunisia